Bingo! (stylised as BINGO!) is Japanese idol group AKB48's sixth single,  and the fourth major single released through DefSTAR Records, on July 18, 2007.

Promotion
The music video was filmed by the same director filmed "Seifuku ga Jama o Suru", although the theme is totally different.  All 46 members of AKB48 participated in the video clip, filmed in Onjuku, Chiba and Makuhari Messe.

Each  CD also includes 2 DVDs, one is video clip and the other is "Making of "Bingo!".

Sony Music offered high resolution closeup portraits of the 18 Senbatsu members as wallpaper downloads on their website for the limited duration of 36 hours after the song's release.

Reception

The single charted 5 weeks in the top 200 with the highest rank at #6, then-highest ever record for AKB48. "Bingo!" sold 25,611 copies.

Track listing

Charts

Reported sales

Personnel

Center: Minami Takahashi, Atsuko Maeda

The title track was sung by 18 members, including 3 members chosen from Team B. It was also the debut for then-youngest member Manami Oku.
Team A - Tomomi Itano, Haruna Kojima, Atsuko Maeda, Minami Minegishi, Rina Nakanishi, Mai Oshima, Mariko Shinoda, Minami Takahashi,
Team K - Sayaka Akimoto, Tomomi Kasai, Yuka Masuda, Sae Miyazawa, Manami Oku, Erena Ono, Yuko Oshima
Team B - Natsumi Hirajima, Yuki Kashiwagi, Mayu Watanabe

References 

AKB48 songs
2007 singles
Songs with lyrics by Yasushi Akimoto
Defstar Records singles
2007 songs
MNL48 songs